Dasht-e Soltanabad-e Do (also Romanized as Dasht-e Solţānābād-e Do) is a village in Kuhestan Rural District, Rostaq District, Darab County, Fars Province, Iran. At the 2006 census, its population was 105, in 22 families.

References 

Populated places in Darab County